The Department of Health is a part of the Government of New Brunswick. It is charged with administration and delivery of public healthcare in New Brunswick.

History 

The department was first established in 1918 as the Department of Health and Labour and gradually grew in importance, splitting in two in 1944 with one section becoming the Department of Health. It began to grow rapidly in the 1960s when Premier Louis Robichaud's equal opportunity program consolidated jurisdiction for health with the province as opposed to local governments and also with the introduction of public medicine in the same decade.

The department eventually came to be named the Department of Health and Community Services as it gained responsibility for new programs such as long-term care in nursing homes, local psychological services and so on. On March 23, 2000 when Premier Bernard Lord restructured the New Brunswick Cabinet. He split the department with the health delivery sections of the department becoming the Department of Health and Wellness, while the long-term care and community psychological services joined with other branches of government to form the Department of Family and Community Services. "Wellness" was included in the name of the new department to draw focus to that relatively new paradigm on which the government intended to focus.  On February 14, 2006, it was again split with the Wellness promotion aspects being joined with the Culture and Sport Secretariat to form the new Department of Wellness, Culture and Sport.

Health authorities
The Department of Health funds two health authorities to deliver operational medical services in the province:

 Horizon Health Network
 Vitalité Health Network

Ministers 

1 Furlong was Minister of Health and Community Services until March 23, 2000 after which he was Minister of Health and Wellness.

External links
Department of Health

Health and Wellness